In musical set theory, an interval class (often abbreviated: ic), also known as unordered pitch-class interval, interval distance, undirected interval, or "(even completely incorrectly) as 'interval mod 6'", is the shortest distance in pitch class space between two unordered pitch classes. For example, the interval class between pitch classes 4 and 9 is 5 because 9 − 4 = 5 is less than 4 − 9 = −5 ≡ 7 (mod 12). See modular arithmetic for more on modulo 12. The largest interval class is 6 since any greater interval n may be reduced to 12 − n.

Use of interval classes 

The concept of interval class accounts for octave, enharmonic, and inversional equivalency. Consider, for instance, the following passage:

(To hear a MIDI realization, click the following: 

In the example above, all four labeled pitch-pairs, or dyads, share a common "intervallic color." In atonal theory, this similarity is denoted by interval class—ic 5, in this case. Tonal theory, however, classifies the four intervals differently: interval 1 as perfect fifth; 2, perfect twelfth; 3, diminished sixth; and 4, perfect fourth.

Notation of interval classes

The unordered pitch class interval i(a, b) may be defined as

where i is an ordered pitch-class interval .

While notating unordered intervals with parentheses, as in the example directly above, is perhaps the standard, some theorists, including Robert , prefer to use braces, as in i{a, b}.  Both notations are considered acceptable.

Table of interval class equivalencies

See also
Pitch interval
Similarity relation

Sources

Further reading
Friedmann, Michael (1990). Ear Training for Twentieth-Century Music. New Haven: Yale University Press.  (cloth)  (pbk)

Musical set theory